Karol Beck and Jaroslav Levinský were the defending champions, but they chose to not participate this year.
Sanchai Ratiwatana and Sonchat Ratiwatana won in the final 6–4, 7–5, against Mario Ančić and Lovro Zovko

Seeds

Draw

Draw

External links
Main Draw

Intersport Heilbronn Open - Doubles
2010 Doubles